Dobříč is a municipality and village in Plzeň-North District in the Plzeň Region of the Czech Republic. It has about 400 inhabitants.

Administrative parts
The village of Čivice is an administrative part of Dobříč.

References

Villages in Plzeň-North District